James Trainer Rowan (27 July 1935 – 21 June 2015) was a Scottish footballer and manager.

References

External links

1935 births
2015 deaths
Footballers from Glasgow
Scottish footballers
Association football inside forwards
Glasgow United F.C. players
Celtic F.C. players
Stirling Albion F.C. players
Clyde F.C. players
Dunfermline Athletic F.C. players
Airdrieonians F.C. (1878) players
Falkirk F.C. players
Partick Thistle F.C. players
Scottish Football League players
Scottish football managers
Falkirk F.C. managers
East Stirlingshire F.C. managers
Scottish Football League managers
Celtic F.C. non-playing staff
Clyde F.C. non-playing staff
Scottish Junior Football Association players